The National Register of Historic Monuments is the official English name of the Romania government's list of national heritage sites known as Monumente istorice. In Romania, these include sites, buildings, structures, and objects considered worthy of preservation due to the importance of their Romanian cultural heritage. The list, created in 2004, contains places that have been designated by the Ministry of Culture and National Patrimony of Romania and are maintained by the Romanian National Institute of Historical Monuments, as being of national historic significance.

Historical monuments in Romania per county

As of 2010, there are 29,540 entries listed individually. Of these, 2,621 are in Bucharest; 1,630 in Iași; 1,381 in Cluj; 1,239 in Dâmbovița; 1,069 in Prahova; 1,023 in Argeș; 1,017 in Mureș; 1,014 in Sibiu; 983 in Brașov; 865 in Buzău; 833 in Caraș-Severin; 790 in Vâlcea; 765 in Bistrița-Năsăud; 758 in Olt; 740 in Harghita; 724 in Ilfov; 699 in Dolj; 684 in Constanța; 679 in Alba; 588 in Covasna; 582 in Maramureș; 569 in Mehedinți; 567 in Tulcea; 544 in Sălaj; 542 in Giurgiu; 537 in Neamț; 520 in Hunedoara; 517 in Suceava; 509 in Botoșani; 501 in Gorj; 435 in Bihor; 434 in Vaslui; 427 in Vrancea; 413 in Arad; 393 in Teleorman; 364 in Bacău; 338 in Timiș; 310 in Satu Mare; 284 in Călărași; 263 in Galați; 218 in Ialomița; 171 in Brăila.

LMI Code
The LMI code (List of the Historical Monuments code) identifies uniquely an historical monument or archaeological site, and includes, in this order:
 Romanian county code, using ISO 3166-2:RO
 A Roman numeral indicating the type of monument:
 I: archaeological
 II: architectural
 III: public monuments (e. g. statues)
 IV: memorials and gravestones
 A lowercase letter: m for an individual monument, a for an ensemble and s for an archaeological site
 A capital letter: A for monuments of national interest, B for local interest
 A five-digit serial number. If the site is part of an ensemble, this is indicated by a decimal point followed by 01, 02, and so forth.

For example, IS-II-a-A-03806 is the LMI code for Cetățuia Monastery. IS indicates the site is in Iași County. II indicates it is an architectural monument, a that it is an ensemble, A that it is of national interest, and 03806 is its unique code. The ensemble has six individual sites, so for instance the monastery's bell tower, the fifth site listed, has code IS-II-m-A-03806.05.

Sites may also have a RAN Code, indicating they are part of the National Archaeological Record (Repertoriul Arheologic Național), a register including sites with archaeological potential, sites where archaeological excavations have taken place or ruined archaeological sites.

See also
 List of historical monuments in Romania, the list of monumente istorice by LMI code
Ministry of Culture and National Patrimony (Romania)
List of museums in Romania
List of castles in Romania
List of religious buildings in Romania
UNESCO World Heritage Sites in Romania
List of ancient cities in Thrace and Dacia
Romanian archaeology
Archaeological cultures in Romania
Archaeological sites in Romania
Culture of Romania
List of heritage registers

References

External links

 Monuments listed by UNESCO in Romania at Romanian Ministry of Culture and National Patrimony (in Romanian)
 eGISpat geographic information system by Romanian National Institute of Historical Monuments (includes LMI lookup)
 National Archaeological Record of Romania (RAN) by Romanian Ministry of Culture and National Patrimony
 Mapserver for Romanian National Cultural Heritage by Romanian Institute for Cultural Memory
  	Monuments and sites in Romania viewable on Google Earth at Romanian Ministry of Culture and National Patrimony (in Romanian)
 Dacian fortresses, settlements and Roman castra from Romania: Google Maps / Google Earth

Romania
Romania